{{DISPLAYTITLE:C18H16O3}}
The molecular formula C18H16O3 (molar mass: 280.31 g/mol, exact mass: 280.1099 u) may refer to:

 Ipriflavone
 Phenprocoumon

Molecular formulas